Abkhazian Che with descender (Ҿ ҿ; italics: Ҿ ҿ) is a letter of the Cyrillic script. Its form is derived from the Cyrillic letter Abkhazian Che (Ҽ ҽ Ҽ ҽ) by the addition of a descender.

Abkhazian Che with descender is used in the alphabet of the Abkhazian language, where it represents the retroflex ejective affricate  .

Computing codes

See also
Cyrillic characters in Unicode
Abkhazian Che

References

Cyrillic letters with diacritics
Letters with descender (diacritic)